The 2021 NCAA Division I Wrestling Championships took place from March 18–20, 2021, in St. Louis, Missouri at the Enterprise Center. The tournament was the 90th NCAA Division I Wrestling Championship, following the cancellation of the 2020 edition, and featured 63 teams across that level.

Due to the COVID-19 pandemic in the United States, the event was forced to occur with modifications. Due to the same reason, the Ivy League was unable to compete through the season, leaving out notable teams like Cornell and Princeton, therefore notable wrestlers such as two-time NCAA champion Yianni Diakomihalis and returning All-American Vito Arujau.

In the tournament, Iowa clinched its first NCAA title since 2010 and finished with one individual national champion, while the defending Penn State became the runner-up of the tournament with four individual national champions. Little Rock made its NCAA tournament debut with one national qualifier, while it was also the last year for Stanford and Fresno State. Shane Griffith became the second ever NCAA champion from Stanford, and as a response to the cut of the school's wrestling team (Stanford eventually decided to keep the program), he wore a black singlet with no logo during the finals match, and was named the Outstanding Wrestler afterwards. North Carolina also saw its first National champion since 1995, with Austin O'Connor at 149 pounds.

Team results 

 Note: Top 10 only
 (H): Team from hosting U.S. state

Individual results 

 Note: Table does not include wrestlebacks
 (H): Individual from hosting U.S. State

Source:

References 

NCAA Division I Wrestling Championships
NCAA Division I Wrestling Championships
NCAA Division I Wrestling Championships
Wrestling in the United States
Wrestling in Missouri
NCAA Division I Wrestling Championships